The 1989 New York City mayoral election was held on Tuesday, November 7.

Incumbent Mayor Ed Koch, who had served since 1978, ran for an unprecedented fourth term in office but was defeated in the Democratic Party primary by Manhattan Borough President David Dinkins. Dinkins went on to narrowly defeat U.S. Attorney for the Southern District of New York Rudy Giuliani, the candidate of both the Republican Party and Liberal Party of New York. Dinkins won with 50.42% of the vote to Giuliani's 47.84%.

Whereas the two preceding mayoral elections of the 1980s had been landslide victories for Koch, who had not lost a single borough and had received the co-endorsement of the Republican Party in 1981, this election was a closely contested race. Dinkins won majorities in the Bronx, Manhattan, and Brooklyn, while Giuliani carried Queens and won a landslide on Staten Island. Four years later, in the 1993 election, Dinkins and Giuliani would face each other again in a re-match and Dinkins would narrowly lose to Giuliani in his bid for re-election.

Democratic primary

Candidates 
 David Dinkins, Manhattan Borough President
 Harrison J. Goldin, New York City Comptroller
 Ed Koch, incumbent Mayor since 1978
 Richard Ravitch, former Chairman of the Metropolitan Transportation Authority

Declined 
 Andrew Stein, President of the New York City Council

Polling

Results

Republican primary

Results 
Giuliani won the Republican Primary, defeating Ron Lauder 77,150 (67.0%) to 37,960 (33.0%)

General election

Results 

| ||||||||||||||

Giuliani vote was 815,387 Republican and 55,077 Liberal. Other vote was 1,732 Lenora Fulani-New Alliance; 1,671-James Harris-Socialist Workers; 1,118 Warren Raum-Libertarian; 435 Mazelis-Workers League.

References

Mayoral election
1989
New York City mayoral
New York